Mount Fisher may refer to:

Fisher Caldera, a large volcanic caldera in Alaska
Mount Fisher (Antarctica), a mountain of the Prince Olav mountain range
Mount Fisher (British Columbia), a mountain in the Canadian Rockies

See also
Fisher Massif, a rock massif in Antarctica